Nick Lowe is an English singer-songwriter, musician, and producer. His discography consists of 14 studio albums, 1 live album, 3 EPs, 23 singles, and 6 compilations. In addition, he has been a performer and producer on numerous albums by other artists.

Albums

Studio

Live

EPs

Singles

With Brinsley Schwarz

With Rockpile

With Little Village

Compilation albums
 1984: 16 All Time Lowes (Diabolo) - compilation of Lowe's songs
 1986: Nick's Knack (Demon) - compilation of Lowe's songs
 1989: Basher: The Best of Nick Lowe (Demon / Columbia) - compilation of Lowe's songs
 1991: The Wilderness Years (Demon) - post-Brinsley Schwarz material recorded before the release of Jesus of Cool
 1998: Hens' Teeth (Edsel) - compilation of singles by Kippington Lodge, Brinsley Schwarz and Brinsley Schwarz under various aliases; includes 9 songs with Lowe as lead vocalist and 4 songs written or co-written by Lowe
 1999: The Doings: The Solo Years (Demon) - 86-track 4-disc boxed compilation of Lowe's songs
 2009: Quiet Please... The New Best of Nick Lowe (Proper / Yep Roc) - 49-track compilation of Lowe's songs

As producer

For Elvis Costello
 1977: My Aim Is True (Stiff / Columbia)
 1978: This Year's Model (Radar / Columbia)
 1978: Live at Hollywood High (Hip-O Select) released 2010
 1979: Armed Forces (Radar / Columbia)
 1980: Get Happy!! (F-Beat / Columbia)
 1980: Taking Liberties (Columbia) 1977-1980 compilation co-produced by Costello and Lowe - also released with alterations as Ten Bloody Marys & Ten How's Your Fathers on F-Beat
 1981: Trust (F-beat / Columbia) - co-produced with Roger Bechirian
 1986: Blood & Chocolate (Demon / Columbia) - co-produced with Colin Fairley

For others
 1976: Graham Parker and The Rumour - Howlin' Wind - (Vertigo / Mercury)
 1976: Graham Parker and The Rumour - Heat Treatment (Mercury) - produced the song "Back Door Love"
 1977: The Damned - Damned Damned Damned (Stiff)
 1977: Dr. Feelgood - Be Seeing You (United Artists)
 1977: Graham Parker - Stick to Me (Vertigo / Mercury)
 1978: Mickey Jupp - Juppanese (Stiff) - produced tracks 1 through 7
 1978: Wreckless Eric - Wreckless Eric (album) (Stiff) - co-produced with Barry Farmer, Larry Wallis, and Ian Dury
 1980: Carlene Carter - Musical Shapes (Warner Bros. / F-Beat)
 1980: Dr. Feelgood - A Case of the Shakes (United Artists)
 1980: Johnny Cash - Rockabilly Blues (Columbia) - produced the song "Without Love"
 1980: The Pretenders - Pretenders (Real / Sire) - produced the song "Stop Your Sobbing"
 1981: Carlene Carter - Blue Nun (Warner Bros. / F-Beat) - co-produced with Roger Bechirian
 1982: The Fabulous Thunderbirds - T-Bird Rhythm (Chrysalis)
 1982: Paul Carrack - Suburban Voodoo (Epic)
 1983: John Hiatt - Riding with the King (Geffen) - produced side 2 of the album
 1983: The Moonlighters - Rush Hour (Demon)
 1985: The Men They Couldn't Hang - Night of a Thousand Candles (Demon)
 1986: The Redskins - Neither Washington Nor Moscow (London) - produced track 5, "Keep On Keepin' On!"
 1990: Katydids - Katydids (Reprise)

As primary artist/song contributor
 1977: A Bunch of Stiff Records (Stiff Records) - track 1, "I Love My Label"
 1978: Live Stiffs Live (Stiff) as Nick Lowe's Last Chicken in the Shop: track 1, "I Knew the Bride (When She Used to Rock 'n' Roll)": track 2, "Let's Eat" (live compilation of the first Stiff tour).
 1994: various artists - Adios Amigo: A Tribute to Arthur Alexander (Razor & Tie) - track 11, "In the Middle of It All"
 1996: various artists - Rig Rock Deluxe: A Musical Tribute to the American Truck Driver (Upstart) - track 14, "I'm Coming Home" with the Impossible Birds
 1999: various artists - Original Soundtrack: Mumford (Hollywood) - track 3, "From Now On"
 2002: various artists - Evangeline Made: A Tribute to Cajun Music (Vanguard) - track 13, "Arrête Pas la Musique (Don't Stop the Music)"
 2004: various artists - Sweetheart: Love Songs (Hear Music) - track 1, "It's All in the Game"
 2011: various artists - Rave On Buddy Holly (Hear Music / Fasntasy) - track 11, "Changing All Those Changes"

As sideman
 1971: Ernie Graham - Ernie Graham (Liberty) - bass
 1972: Keith Cross and Peter Ross - Bored Civilians (Decca) - guitar
 1978: Carlene Carter - Carlene Carter (Warner Bros.) - bass on track 4, "I Once Knew Love"
 1978: Dave Edmunds - Tracks on Wax 4 (Swan Song) - bass
 1979: Dave Edmunds - Repeat When Necessary (Swan Song) - bass
 1981: Dave Edmunds - Twangin... (Swan Song) - bass
 1984: Elvis Costello - "Out of Our Idiot" (Demon) - duet with Elvis Costello on "Baby It's You"
 1987: John Hiatt - Bring the Family (A&M) - bass, vocals
 1991: Elvis Costello - Mighty Like a Rose (Warner Bros.) - bass on track 2, "Hurry Down Doomsday (The Bugs Are Taking Over)"
 1991: John Lee Hooker - Mr. Lucky (Silvertone) - bass on track 4, "This Is Hip"
 1994: Elvis Costello - Brutal Youth (Warner Bros.) - bass
 2001: Los Straitjackets - Sing Along with Los Straitjackets (Yep Roc) - bass on track 11, "Shake That Rat"
 2004: Tanita Tikaram - Sentimental (Naïve) - backing vocals on track 7, "Don't Let the Cold"
 2004: Geraint Watkins - Dial 'W' for Watkins (Yep Roc / Proper) - duet with Geraint Watkins on track 13, "Only a Rose"
 2006: Bill Kirchen - Hammer of the Honky Tonk Gods (Proper) - bass and vocals
 2009: Martin Belmont - The Guest List (Gold Top) - guest vocals on track 3, "A Man in Love"
 2010: Bill Kirchen - Word to the Wise (Proper) - duet with Paul Carrack on track 2, "Shelly's Winter Love"
 2010: Robyn Hitchcock and the Venus 3 - Propellor Time (Sartorial) - vocals
 2012: Wilco - iTunes Session (dBpm) - lead vocals on track 8, "Cruel to Be Kind"
 2017: Blackie and the Rodeo Kings - Kings and Kings (File Under Music) - vocals on track 7, "Secret of a Long Lasting Love"

As composer
1972 - 1979
 1972: Teddy Rastor - Come On, Come On (Sayton Records) - B-side of single, "Brand New You, Brand New Me"
 1975: Dave Edmunds - Subtle as a Flying Mallet (RCA)- track 10, "She's My Baby"
 1975: Dr. Feelgood - Malpractice (Columbia) - track 10, "Because You're Mine" (co-written with John B. Sparks and Wilko Johnson)
 1976: Kursaal Flyers - The Great Artiste (UK Records) - track 9, "Television"
 1976: Dave Edmunds - Here Comes the Weekend (Swan Song Records) - A-side of single
 1977: Dave Edmunds - Get It (Swan Song) - track 2, "I Knew the Bride"; track 4, "Here Comes the Weekend" (co-written with Dave Edmunds); track 11, "What Did I Do Last Night?"; track 12, "Little Darlin'" (co-written with Dave Edmunds)
 1977: The Rumour - Max (Mercury) - track 1, "Mess With Love"
 1978: Dave Edmunds - Tracks on Wax 4 (Swan Song) - track 2, "Never Been in Love" (co-written with Rockpile); track 4, "Television"; track 5, "What Looks Best on You" (co-written with Dave Edmunds); track 7, "Deborah" (co-written with Dave Edmunds); track 11, "Heart of the City"
 1978: Dr. Feelgood - Private Practice (United Artists) - track 4, "Milk And Alcohol" and track 8, "It Wasn't Me" (both co-written with Gypie Mayo)
 1978: Lene Lovich - Stateless (Stiff) - track 6, "Tonight"
 1978: Leo Kottke - Burnt Lips (Chrysalis) - track 1, "Endless Sleep"
 1978: The Rumour - Frogs Sprouts Clogs and Krauts (Stiff) - track B1 "Leaders" (co-written with Martin Belmont)
 1979: Carlene Carter - Two Sides to Every Woman (Warner Bros.) - track 1, "Do It in a Heartbeat" (co-written with Carlene Carter)
 1979: Dr. Feelgood - As It Happens (United Artists) - track 10, "Milk and Alcohol" (co-written with Gypie Mayo)

1980-1989
 1980: The Rumour - Purity of Essence (Stiff) - track 2, "I Don't Ever Want the Night to End"
 1981: Dave Edmunds - Twangin... (Swan Song) - track 4, "(I'm Gonna Start) Living Again If It Kills Me" (co-written with Carlene Carter and Dave Edmunds); track 9, "I'm Only Human" (co-written with Rockpile)
 1981: The Fabulous Thunderbirds - Butt Rockin' (Chrysalis) - track 2, "One's Too Many" (co-written with Kim Wilson)
 1982: Paul Carrack - Suburban Voodoo (Epic) - track 3, "I Need You" (co-written with Martin Belmont and Paul Carrack); track 4, "I'm in Love" (co-written with Carlene Carter); track 5, "Don't Give My Heart a Break" (co-written with Carlene Carter and Paul Carrack); track 8, "What a Way to Go" and track 9, "So Right, So Wrong" (both co-written with J. E. Ceiling, James Eller, Martin Belmont, and Paul Carrack); track 10, "From Now On"
 1983: Alvin Stardust - A Picture of You (Stiff) - track 4, "What Looks Good On You Is Me" (co-written with Dave Edmunds)
 1983: Carlene Carter C'est C Bon (Epic) - track 9, "Don't Give My Heart a Break" (co-written with Carlene Carter and Paul Carrack)
 1985: Don Dixon - Most of the Girls Like to Dance but Only Some of the Boys Like To (Enigma) - track 3, "Skin Deep"
 1985: Queen Ida And Her Zydeco Band - Caught in the Act! (GNP Crescendo) - track 6, "Half a Boy, Half a Man"
 1986: The Men They Couldn't Hang - How Green Is the Valley (MCA) - track 6, "Wishing Well"
 1987: Dave Edmunds - I Hear You Rockin' (Columbia) - track 2, "Here Comes the Weekend" (co-written with Dave Edmunds); track 10, "I Knew the Bride (When She Used to Rock and Roll)"
 1987: The Oyster Band - Wide Blue Yonder (Cooking Vinyl) - track 7, "The Rose of England"

1990-1999
 1990: The Flaming Lips - In a Priest Driven Ambulance (Restless / Plain) - track D3.2, "(What's So Funny 'Bout) Peace, Love, and Understanding" bonus track on 2005 reissue
 1991: Diana Ross - The Force Behind the Power (Motown) - track 3, "Battlefield" (co-written with Paul Carrack)
 1992: various artists - The Bodyguard (soundtrack) (Arista) - track 10, "(What's So Funny 'Bout) Peace, Love and Understanding" performed by Curtis Stigers
 1993: Freakwater - Feels Like the Third Time (Thrill Jockey) - track 6, "You Make Me"
 1994: Johnny Cash - American Recordings (American) - track 3, "The Beast in Me"
 1995: The Minus 5 - Old Liquidator (East Side Digital) - track 10, "Basing Street"
 1998: Linda Ronstadt featuring Aaron Neville - Cry Like a Rainstorm, Howl Like the Wind (Elektra) - track 4, "I Need You" (co-written with Martin Belmont and Paul Carrack); track 9, "So Right, So Wrong" (co-written with J. E. Ceiling, James Eller, Martin Belmont, and Paul Carrack)
 1998: The Mavericks - Trampoline (MCA Nashville) - track 14, "All I Get" (co-written with Raul Malo)
 1998: Rod Stewart - When We Were the New Boys (Warner Bros.) - track 7, "Shelly My Love"
 1999: George Thorogood & the Destroyers - Half a Boy/Half a Man (CMC International) - track 4, "Half a Boy, Half a Man"
 1999: various artists - 10 Things I Hate About You (Music from the Motion Picture) (Hollywood) - track 13, "Cruel to Be Kind" (performed by Letters To Cleo)

2000-2009
 2000: Charlie Hunter - Solo Eight String Guitar (Contra Punto) - track 12, "(What's So Funny 'Bout) Peace, Love and Understanding?"
 2000: The Corn Sisters - The Other Women (Mint) - track 13, "Endless Grey Ribbon"
 2000: Dave Edmunds - Live (Castle Music) - track 7, "I Knew the Bride (When She Used to Rock & Roll)"
 2000: Langhorns - Langhorns (Bad Taste) - track 12, "Awesome"
 2002: Solomon Burke - Don't Give Up on Me (Fat Possum) - track 9, "The Other Side of the Coin"
 2003: Robben Ford - Keep On Running (Concord) - track 5, "(What's So Funny 'Bout) Peace, Love, and Understanding"
 2003: George Thorogood and the Destroyers - Ride 'Til I Die (Eagle) - track 10, "That's It, I Quit"
 2004: A Perfect Circle - Emotive (Virgin) - track 3, "(What's So Funny 'Bout) Peace, Love, and Understanding"
 2007: The Holmes Brothers - State of Grace - (Alligator) - track 3, "(What's So Funny 'Bout) Peace, Love, and Understanding" 
 2007: P.J. Olsson - American Scream (CBS Records) - track 13, "(What's So Funny 'Bout) Peace, Love, and Understanding"
 2007: Fatboy Slim - Late Night Tales - track 3, "I Love the Sound of Breaking Glass"
 2008: Brian Burns - Border Radio (Crystal Clear / Presidio) - track 14, "Lately I've Let Things Slide"
 2008: Katy Moffatt - Fewer Things (Zeppelin) - track 3, "What Lack of Love Has Done"
 2008: Neal Morse - Lifeline (Radiant) - bonus disc track 4, "(What's So Funny 'Bout) Peace, Love, and Understanding"
 2009: The BPA - I Think We're Gonna Need a Bigger Boat (Southern Fried) - track 12, "So It Goes"
 2009: Kimon & The Prophets - Roadhouse Party (Ultrascene) - track 9, "(What's So Funny 'Bout) Peace, Love, and Understanding"
 2009: Larz-Kristerz - Om du vill (Sony) - track 4, "Half a Boy and Half a Man"
 2009: Taylor Hicks - The Distance (Adrenaline / Modern Whomp) - track 9, "I Live on a Battlefield" (co-written with Paul Carrack)
 2009: Seth Walker - Leap of Faith (Hyena) - track 8, "Lately I've Let Things Slide"
 2009: Simple Minds - Graffiti Soul (Universal) - track 6, "(What's So Funny 'Bout) Peace, Love, and Understanding" (on Searching for the Lost Boys bonus disc)

2010-2017
 2010: Carrie Rodriguez - Love and Circumstance (Ninth Street Opus) - track 1, "Big Love" (co-written with Ry Cooder, John Hiatt, and Jim Keltner)
 2010: Paul Carrack - A Different Hat (Absolute UK / Carrack) - track 5, "I Live on a Battlefield" (co-written with Paul Carrack)
 2011: Jonell Mosser - Fortunes Lost, Fortunes Told (Brothers Mothers Music) - track 11, "Rome Wasn't Built in a Day"
 2011: Wilco - The Whole Love (Anti- / Epitaph) - track 13, "I Love My Label" (bonus track)
 2012: Paul Carrack - Good Feeling (Carrack / Universal) - track 8, "From Now On"
 2012: Wilco - iTunes Session (dBpm) - track 8, "Cruel to Be Kind"
 2013: Colin Gilmore - The Wild and Hollow (Woobietown) - track 10, "Raging Eyes"
 2013: Kathy Greenholdt - When You're Dead (CD Baby) - track 10, "The Beast in Me"
 2013: Mavis Staples - One True Vine (Anti-) - track 5, "Far Celestial Shore"
 2013: The Strypes - Snapshot (Universal) - track 12, ""Heart of the City"
 2014: David Broza - East Jerusalem/West Jerusalem (BMG / S-Curve) - track 9, "(What's So Funny 'Bout) Peace, Love, and Understanding"
 2014: JD McPherson - The Warm Covers EP (New Rounder) - track 3, "Rome Wasn't Built In a Day"
 2017: Billy Valentine - Brit Eyed Soul (Cleopatra) - track 12, "(What's So Funny 'Bout) Peace, Love, and Understanding"

Live radio performances
 1995: various artists - 2 Meter Sessies - Volume 6 (Radio Records) - track 9, "True Love Travels on a Gravel Road"
 1996: various artists - Q107's Concerts in the Sky: The Campfire Versions (MCA Records Canada) - track 5, "(What's So Funny 'Bout) Peace Love and Understanding"
 1996: various artists - KGSR Broadcast, Volume 6 (KGSR) - track 2-3, "Soulful Wind"
 2002: various artists - Live at the World Cafe, 10th Anniversary (World Cafe) - track 2-6, "(What's So Funny 'Bout) Peace Love and Understanding"
 2008: various artists - Live at the World Cafe, Volume 24 (World Cafe) - track 9, "I Trained Her to Love Me"
 2011: "Comedy Bang! Bang!" podcast episode 126, featured "Stoplight Roses," "Sensitive Man," "All Men Are Liars," and "(What's So Funny 'Bout) Peace, Love, and Understanding"
 2012: various artists - The Old Grey Whistle Test Live (BBC / Rhino) - track 3-12, "Sensitive Man"
 2013: Wait Wait... Don't Tell Me! (NPR) featured "(What's So Funny 'Bout) Peace Love and Understanding" and "Christmas at the Airport"

Tributes
 2001: various artists - Labour of Love: The Music of Nick Lowe (Telarc) - 13 songs featuring Dar Williams, Tom Petty, Elvis Costello, and others
 2005: various artists - Lowe Profile: A Tribute to Nick Lowe (Brewery) two-disc, 30-song collection featuring Dave Alvin, Foster & Lloyd, Ian Gomm, and others
 2002: various artists - The Stiff Generation: If It Ain't Stiff It Ain't Worth a Tribute (Groove Disques) - track 1, "So It Goes"; track 9, "Endless Sleep"; track 14, "I Love the Sound of Breaking Glass"; track 24: "I Love My Label"
 2005: Elizabeth McQueen and the Firebrands - Happy Doing What We’re Doing (Freedom [City Hall]) tribute to pub rock features several songs written and co-written by Lowe
 2009: various artists - Si No Es Stiff No Merece un Tributo (Culturapop / Rock Indiana) - Spanish compilation features 3 songs written by Lowe
 2012: various artists - Lowe Country: The Songs of Nick Lowe (Fiesta Red) - 13 songs featuring Ron Sexsmith, Robert Ellis,  Chatham County Line and others
 2014: Davey Lane - Under the Covers includes covers of all 11 songs from Jesus of Cool 2015: Duck the Piano Wire - Duck the Knife subtitled A Homemade Remake of Nick the Knife, includes covers of all 12 songs
 2017: Los Straitjackets - What's So Funny About Peace, Love and Los Straitjackets (Yep Roc) instrumental versions of Nick Lowe compositions

Cinema

 1979: various artists - Americathon (soundtrack) (Lorimar) - track 6, "Without Love"
 1979: various artists - That Summer (soundtrack) (Arista) - track 14, "(I Love the Sound of) Breaking Glass"
 1979: various artists featuring The Ramones - Rock 'n' Roll High School (soundtrack) (Sire) - track 5, "So It Goes"
 1983: Easy Money (soundtrack) (CBS Records) - track 5, "We Want Action"
 1986: Absolute Beginners (soundtrack) (Virgin) - Lowe contributed an original song, "Little Cat (You've Never Had It So Good)"
 1995: Australian film All Men Are Liars featured Lowe's song "All Men Are Liars"

Television
 1995: The Brothers Grunt (MTV) season 4, episode 30, "The Ugly Gruntling" featured the music video for "All Men Are Liars" 
 1999: The Sopranos (HBO) season 1, episode 1 featured Lowe's recording of "The Beast in Me"
 2011: True Blood'' (HBO) season 4, episode 43, "Cold Grey Light of Dawn" featured Lowe's song "Cold Grey Light of Dawn"

References

External links
 
 
 

Discographies of British artists
Rock music discographies
New wave discographies